Henry James Knight VC (5 November 1878 – 24 November 1955) was an English recipient of the Victoria Cross, the highest and most prestigious award for gallantry in the face of the enemy that can be awarded to British and Commonwealth forces.

Details
Born in Yeovil, Somerset (Born James Huntley Knight, Enlisted Henry James Knight) he was 21 years old, and a corporal in the 1st Battalion, The King's (Liverpool) Regiment, British Army during the Second Boer War when the following deed took place for which he was awarded the VC. The full citation was published in the London Gazette of 4 January 1901 and reads:

Knight stayed in South Africa until after the war ended in June 1902, returning home on the SS Carisbrook Castle which arrived in Southampton in early December that year.

Further information
He later achieved the rank of captain in the Manchester Regiment. His Victoria Cross is displayed at the Museum of the King's Regiment, Liverpool, England.

References

Monuments to Courage (David Harvey, 1999)
The Register of the Victoria Cross (This England, 1997)
Victoria Crosses of the Anglo-Boer War (Ian Uys, 2000)

External links
Location of grave and VC medal (Dorset)
angloboerwar.com

1878 births
1955 deaths
People from Yeovil
British recipients of the Victoria Cross
Second Boer War recipients of the Victoria Cross
King's Regiment (Liverpool) soldiers
Manchester Regiment officers
British Army personnel of the Second Boer War
Royal Fusiliers soldiers
Military personnel from Somerset
British Army personnel of World War I
British Army recipients of the Victoria Cross
Burials in Dorset